Circassian , also known as Cherkess , is a subdivision of the Northwest Caucasian language family, spoken by the Circassian people. There are two Circassian languages, defined by their literary standards, Adyghe (also known as West Circassian), with half a million speakers, and Kabardian (also known as East Circassian), with a million. The languages are highly mutually intelligible with one another, but differ to a degree where they would be considered clear-cut dialects. The earliest extant written records of the Circassian languages are in the Arabic script, recorded by the Turkish traveller Evliya Çelebi in the 17th century.

There is consensus among the linguistic community about the fact that Adyghe and Kabardian are typologically distinct languages. However, the local terms for these languages refer to them as dialects. The Circassian people call themselves адыгэ (adyge; English: Adyghe) in their native language. In the southwestern part of European Russia, there is also a Federal Subject called Adygea (Russian: Адыгея, Adygeya), enclaved within Krasnodar Krai, which is named after the Circassian endonym. In the Russian language, the Circassian subdivision is treated as a group of languages and called адыгские (adygskie, meaning the Adyghe languages), whereas the Adyghe language is called адыгейский (adygeyskiy, meaning the language of those in [the Republic of] Adygea). The terms Circassian and Cherkess are sometimes used in several languages as synonyms for the Northwest Caucasian languages in general or the Adyghe language in particular.

Circassian languages

Adyghe language
The Black Sea coast dialects
Zhaney dialect
Natukhai dialect (Netʼx́uajebze)
Shapsug dialect (Shapsyǵabze)
North Shapsugs, Great Shapsugs, Kuban Shapsugs dialect (Шапсыгъэ шху; Shapsyǵ shyxu)
Temirgoy-Shapsugs, Pseuşko accent (Кӏэмгуе-шапсыгъ; Chʼemgueý-shapsyǵ)
South Shapsugs, Small Shapsugs, Coastal Shapsugs Black Sea Shapsugs (Шапсыгъэ-цӏыкӏу; Shapsyǵe-tsʼykʼu) dialect.
Kfar Kama dialect (Кфар Камэм ишапсыгъэбзэ; Kfar Kamem ishapsyǵebze): Shapsug dialect spoken by the villagers of Kfar Kama in Israel.
Hakuchi dialect (ХьакӀуцубзэ, Къарацхаибзэ; Hakʼutsubze, Qaratsxaibze)
The Kuban river dialects
Bzhedug dialect (Bɀedyǵubze) : Spoken by the Circassians in Republic of Adygea and Biga.
Temirgoy (Chʼemıguıyabze, Chʼemguibze) : Literary Adyghe. Also spoken by the Circassians in Republic of Adygea.
Abzakh dialect (Abźaxabze) : Spoken by the Circassians in Rehaniya in Israel and the Circassians in Syria from Golan Heights.
Mamkhegh dialect
Yegeruqay dialect
Hatuqwai dialect
Mequash dialect
Kabardian language
Kabardian
West Kabardian
Kuban
Kuban-Zelenchuk (Cherkess)
 Central Kabardian
Baksan (Basis for the literary language)
Malka
 Eastern Kabardian
Terek
Mozdok
 North Kabardian
Mulka
Zabardiqa (1925 until 1991 Soviet Zaparika)
 Baslaney dialect (Besłınıýbze)

Alphabet

 Adyghe language (also known as West Circassian, ; Kʼaxıbzə) — The language of the west Circassian tribes: Shapsug, Abzakh, Natukhai, Bzhedug, Temirgoy. The Alphabet is based on the Temirgoy dialect. The Circassian alphabet was created in 1918 by the Kabardian linguist Naguma Shora.

 Kabardian language (also known as East Circassian, ; Qeberdeýbze) — The language of the east Circassian tribes : Kabarday and Baslaney. The Alphabet is based on the Kabardian dialect.

Sound changes 

Sound changes between Adyghe (Temirgoy) and Kabardian:
Adyghe a ↔ э Kabardian: адыгабзэ ↔ aдыгэбзэ (Adyghe); бае ↔ бей (rich); аслъан ↔ аслъэн (lion); къэплъан ↔ къаплъэн (tiger); дунай ↔ дуней (world); тхьакӀумэ ↔ тхьэкӀумэ (ear); хьарыф ↔ хьэрф (letter); тхьаркъо ↔ тхьэрыкъуэ (pigeon); Ӏае ↔ Ӏей (ugly); хьамлыу ↔ хьэмбылу (worm); хьау ↔ хьэуэ (no)
Adyghe ы ↔ э Kabardian: ны ↔ анэ (mother)
Adyghe э ↔ ы Kabardian: хъэдэн ↔ хъыдан (lilac)
Adyghe а ↔ ы Kabardian: Ӏахьыл ↔ Ӏыхьлы (cloth)
Adyghe и ↔ ы Kabardian: мэлэӀич ↔ мэлэӀыч (angel)
Adyghe ы ↔ и Kabardian: сабый ↔ сабий (child)
Adyghe ы ↔ е Kabardian: жъэжъый ↔ жьэжьей (kidney); дэжъый ↔ дэжьей (hazelnut)
Adyghe ц ↔ дз Kabardian: цэ ↔ дзэ (tooth); цыгъо ↔ дзыгъуэ (mouse); пцэжъый ↔ бдзэжьей (fish); уцы ↔ удзы (grass)
Adyghe цу ↔ в Kabardian: цу ↔ вы (ox); цуакъэ ↔ вакъэ (shoe); цунды ↔ вынд (raven); цунды ↔ вынд (raven); цуабзэ ↔ вабдзэ (ploughshare)
Adyghe ч ↔ ж Kabardian: чэмы ↔ жэм (cow); чъыгы ↔ жыг (tree); чэщы ↔ жэщ (night); чылэ ↔ жылэ (village, settlement); пчъын ↔ бжын (to count); чъэн ↔ жэн (to run)
Adyghe ч ↔ дж Kabardian: чэтыу ↔ джэду (cat); чэты ↔ джэд (chicken); апч ↔ абдж (glass)
Adyghe ч ↔ щ Kabardian: пачъыхь ↔ пащтыхь (king); гъучӏы ↔ гъущӏ (iron); упчӏэ ↔ упщӏэ (question); чыӏу ↔ щӏыӏу (button); чъыӏэ ↔ щӏыӏэ (cold); пчэдыжьы ↔ пщэдджыжь (morning)
Adyghe дз ↔ з Kabardian: хъырбыдз ↔ хъарбыз (watermelon)
Adyghe дж ↔ ж Kabardian: баджэ ↔ бажэ (fox); лъэмыдж ↔ лъэмыж (arch, bridge); аджал ↔ ажал (death); хьаджыгъэ ↔ хьэжыгъэ (flour); лъэгуанджэ ↔ лъэгуажьэ (knee); къуаджэ ↔ къуажэ (village)
Adyghe жь ↔ з Kabardian: ежь ↔ езы (him, itself)
Adyghe жъ ↔ жь Kabardian: жъы ↔ жьы (old); бжъэ ↔ бжьэ (bowl, horn, slander); жъэн ↔ жьэн (to fry, to grill)
Adyghe ж ↔ жь Kabardian: бжыхьэ ↔ бжьыхьэ (autumn); жакӀэ ↔ жьакӀэ (beard); бжыдзэ ↔ бжьыдзэ (flea); жэ ↔ жьэ (mouth)
Adyghe жъу ↔ в Kabardian: жъуагъо ↔ вагъо (star); зэжъу ↔ зэвы (narrow); ӏужъу ↔ ӏувы (wide); гъэжъон ↔ гъэвэн (to boil)
Adyghe ш ↔ щ Kabardian: нашэ ↔ нащэ (melon)
Adyghe щ ↔ ш Kabardian: щэ ↔ шэ (milk); щай ↔ шай (tea); щыгъу ↔ шыгъу (salt); ахъщэ ↔ ахъшэ (fund, money); щэбзащ ↔ шабзэ (arrow); щыды ↔ шыд (donkey); щынагъо ↔ шынагъуэ (fear); щыбжьый ↔ шыбжий (black pepper); щэджагъо ↔ шэджагъуэ (noon)
Adyghe шъ ↔ щ Kabardian: шъабэ ↔ щабэ; шъхьэ ↔ щхьэ (head); шъынэ ↔ щынэ (lamp); дышъэ ↔ дыщэ (gold); пшъашъэ ↔ пщащэ (girl); мышъэ ↔ мыщэ (bear); псэушъхь ↔ псэущхьэ (animal); шъэ ↔ ща (100)
Adyghe шӀ ↔ щӀ Kabardian: шӀын ↔ щӀын (to do); шӀэн ↔ щӀэн (to know); гъашӀэ ↔ гъащӀэ (life); пшӀы ↔ пщӀы (ten)  
Adyghe кӀ ↔ щӀ Kabardian: кӀэ ↔ щӀэ (new); кӀалэ ↔ щӀалэ (young-man); мэгыкӀэ ↔ мэгыщӀэ (to launder, to wash); тӀэкӀын ↔ тӀэщӀын (to go off on); икӀыӀу ↔ ищӀыӀу (above); макӀэ ↔ мащӀэ (few); хьакӀэ ↔ хьэщӀэ (guest); ӀункӀыбзэ ↔ ӀунщӀыбз  (key)
Adyghe шъу ↔ ф Kabardian: шъоу ↔ фо (honey); шъуз ↔ фыз (wife); ешъон ↔ ефэн (to drink); уашъо ↔ уафэ (sky); уцышъо ↔ удзыфэ (green); къашъо ↔ къафэ (dance); шъо ↔ фэ (color, skin, you (plural)); шъо ↔ фэ (color, skin, you (plural)); нэшъу ↔ нэф (blind)
Adyghe шӀу ↔ фӀ Kabardian: шӀу ↔ фӀы (well, good); машӀо ↔ мафӀэ (fire); шӀуцӀэ ↔ фӀыцӀэ (black); шӀомыкӀы ↔ фӀамыщӀ (coal); ошӀу ↔ уэфӀ (weather); ӏэшӀу ↔ ӏэфӀ  (sweet); шӀошӏын ↔ фӀэщын (sweet)
Adyghe ф ↔ ху Kabardian: фыжьы ↔ хужьы (white); Ӏофы ↔ Ӏуэху (work, job); мафэ ↔ махуэ (day); гъэмафэ ↔ гъэмахуэ (summer); цӀыфы ↔ цӀыху (person); фабэ ↔ хуабэ (hot); фае ↔ хуей (want, need); фэд ↔ хуэд (like); нэфы ↔ нэху (light); нартыф ↔ нартыху (corn); фэгъэгъун ↔ хуэгъэгъун (to forgive); фэгъэгъун ↔ хуэгъэгъун (to forgive); бжьыныф ↔ бжьыныху (garlic); бзылъфыгъэ ↔ бзылъхугъэ  (woman)
Adyghe хь ↔ хъ Kabardian: нахь ↔ нэхъ (more); шынахьыкӏ ↔ шынэхъыщӏ (younger brother); шынахьыжъ ↔ шынэхъыжь (older brother)
Adyghe къ ↔ кхъ Kabardian: къэ ↔ кхъэ (grave)
Adyghe къу ↔ кхъу Kabardian: къуае ↔ кхъуей (cheese); къужъы ↔ кхъужь (pear); къухьэ ↔ кхъухь (ship)
Adyghe т ↔ д Kabardian: тэ ↔ дэ (we); тамэ ↔ дамэ (shoulder); тамыгь ↔ дамыгъэ (stamp, letter); тыгъужъы ↔ дыгъужь (wolf); тыгъуас ↔ дыгъуасэ (yesterday); ты ↔ адэ (father); тыжьыны ↔ дыжьын (silver); такъикъ ↔ дакъикъэ (minute); атакъэ ↔ адакъэ (rooster, cock); хатэ ↔ хадэ (garden); псычэт ↔ псыджэд (duck); тхьаматэ ↔ тхьэмадэ (leader, boss)
Adyghe п ↔ б Kabardian: панэ ↔ банэ (thorn); пытэ ↔ быдэ (hard); пчэны ↔ бжэн (goat); пыи ↔ бий (enemy); непэ ↔ нобэ (today); пчъын ↔ бжын (to count)
Adyghe м ↔ н Kabardian: мамун ↔ номин (monkey)
Adyghe н ↔ Ø Kabardian: гъунджэ ↔ гъуджэ (mirror)
Adyghe -Ø ↔ -р Kabardian: Ӏехы ↔ Ӏехыр; сӀехы ↔ сӀехыр; тӀехы ↔ тӀехыр 
Adyghe -Ø ↔ -щ Kabardian: тӀыгъ ↔ тӀыгъщ 
Adyghe Ø- ↔ и- Kabardian: джыри ↔ иджыри (yet)

Loanwords 
Circassian languages contain "many loan-words from Arabic, Turkish, Persian (particularly in the area of religion) and Russian".

See also

 Circassia

References

Sources

Literature

 A Dictionary of the Circassian Language, in Two Parts. By Dr. L. Loewe.
 Кумахов М. А. Адыгские языки // Языки мира. Кавказские языки. М., 1999. (in Russian)

Northwest Caucasian languages
Circassians